Lavrentis Machairitsas (5 November 1956 – 9 September 2019) was a Greek rock musician from Volos, Thessaly, Greece.

Biography

Early years 
Machairitsas was born in Volos and began taking piano lessons at the age of six. These lessons lasted a year. At the age of nine he bought his first record, Help! by the Beatles. Three years later, he discovered Revolver by the Beatles.

His first job was at a record store, but because of his lack of punctuality he was fired. He disliked school, and after he started a fight with one of his teachers, he was expelled and excluded from all high schools. He went through countless jobs and served in the army for 14 months.

Termites 
When he left the army, he started singing with Panos Tzabelas in Syntrofia. At the age of 20 he (as Larry), Pavlos Kirkilis (Paul), Takis Bassalakis (Jimmy), and Antonis Mitzelos formed a band called P.L.J. They moved to Paris, hoping for a musical career outside Greece. In 1982, their first album, Armageddon, with English lyrics and long instrumental sections in an art rock or prog rock style, produced by Giannis Doulamis, was released by PolyGram. The album did not meet with much success.

For their second album, they changed their name to Termites and started singing in Greek. In 1984, their third record had a positive reception, and they began gaining in popularity. Giorgos Ntalaras is also featured in this album on the track "Skoni" ("Dust", an elegiac song about cocaine addiction) which became a huge hit. In 1986 they released their fourth album. The last studio record from Termites was "Perimenontas Tin Vrochi" (Waiting For the Rain), released in 1988.

Solo career 
Machairitsas began his solo career in 1989 as a writer and performer. His first album was O Magapas Kai I Sagapo, released by Minos-EMI, which was not well received. However his follow-up Didymoteicho Blues in 1991, including the song of the same name featuring Ntalaras once again, was certified Gold.

Rixe Kokkino Stin Nichta was released in 1993 and featured many other artists such as Vasilis Papakonstantinou. Since then he has been working closely with Dionysis Tsaknis, another well known Greek musician. After performing a large number of live appearances together, they released the live album H Nyhta Tha To Pei.

In 1995, he released Parathyra Pou Kourase I Thea, considered by many to be his best album yet. In 1996, he released Pafsilypon with many other artists. Three years later, he released Etsi Drapetevo Ap' Tis Parees, again with many well-known musicians, especially in the song "Kai Ti Zitao". He then composed the music for the movie Enas Kai Enas. In 2001 he released To Dialeimma Krataei Dyo Zoes, which included songs such as "Matia Dihos Logiki", "Ela Psihoula Mou" and "O Egokentrikos". In 2002 he wrote the music for Giannis Kotsiras' album Xylino Alogaki. His next release was the two-disk album Tosa Chronia Mia Anasa (2007). It included a new song (the title song) and 34 of his career's greatest hits, being his first "best of" album.

Besides the many albums, Machairitsas and Tsaknis hold many concerts all over Greece during the summer.  He has also held concerts with Eleftheria Arvanitaki, Haris Alexiou, Vasilis Papakonstantinou, Pyx Lax, Christos Thivaios and many more

Machairitsas continued to work in Greek rock music and to compose.

In 2016, Machairitsas performed at the Kaye Playhouse at Hunter College in New York during AKTINA's Greek Music Journey concert series.

Death 

On 9 September 2019, Machairitsas suffered a heart attack during his sleep. He was transferred to the hospital of Volos (his birth town), where, at 06:30 the same day, he was pronounced dead at the age of 62.

Discography

References

Sources 
 https://web.archive.org/web/20110106045532/http://www.machairitsas.gr/
 http://portal.kithara.gr/modules.php?name=kiSongdb&file=index&func=bio&who=maxairitsas+laurentgs
 https://web.archive.org/web/20110305005330/http://vidq.gr/maxairitsas/viografiko.htm (Greek)

1956 births
2019 deaths
Eastern Orthodox Christians from Greece
Greek entehno singers
Greek rock singers
People from Magnesia (regional unit)